Allison Elena Barnett (born 19 March 1966) is a British rower. She competed in the women's coxless four event at the 1992 Summer Olympics.

References

External links
 

1966 births
Living people
British female rowers
Olympic rowers of Great Britain
Rowers at the 1992 Summer Olympics
Sportspeople from Reading, Berkshire